Fred or Frederick Cole may refer to:

 Fred Cole (musician) (1948–2017), singer, guitarist, and songwriter of the band Pierced Arrows and formerly Dead Moon
 Fred Cole (footballer) (born 1936), Australian rules footballer
 Fred C. Cole (1912–1986), American librarian and historian
 Fred Cole (gridiron football) (1937–2013), Canadian football player
 Fred Cole (EastEnders), soap opera character
 Frederick Cole (cricketer) (1852–1941), English cricketer
 Frederick W. Cole, British stained-glass artist and designer

See also
 Freddy Cole (born 1931), American jazz singer and pianist